Miss Julie is a 2014 period drama film written and directed by Liv Ullmann, based on the 1888 play of the same name by August Strindberg and starring Jessica Chastain, Colin Farrell and Samantha Morton. Set in Ireland in this adaptation, it had its world premiere in the Special Presentations section of the 2014 Toronto International Film Festival. It was a co-production of Norway, United Kingdom, Ireland, and France.

The film is set in 1890, in County Fermanagh (in what is now Northern Ireland) during the course of a single Midsummer Night. Miss Julie, the daughter of an Anglo-Irish landlord, attempts to seduce her father's peasant valet, John. The affair – overshadowed by power and class – quickly goes to some dark places.

Plot
The movie starts with a young Miss Julie aimlessly wandering in the empty confines of her family's manor house. We hear her calling to her absent mother and walking by a babbling brook where she sees one of her dolls stuck in a tree. She lets out a snicker at the sight of the abandoned doll, and leaves the brook.

We jump to Midsummer Night 1890, where the same manor is deserted, save for three individuals; Kathleen the cook (Samantha Morton), John the valet (Colin Farrell) and Miss Julie (Jessica Chastain), the Baron's daughter. Kathleen and John immediately gossip about the lady of the house, specifically how she forced John to dance with her. Kathleen and John are engaged and John doesn't fail to take pleasure in Kathleen's jealous reaction.

And then, Miss Julie enters. Kathleen takes her leave to look after Miss Julie's suffering dog, while the young aristocrat, who appears to be in a mischievous sort of mood, traps John. The night grows stranger still, as servant and lady exchange impassioned monologues composed of lustful innuendoes and agonizing tension.

John confesses that he's been in love with her since he first laid eyes on her as a child, but the next moment sees him quick to remind her of their vastly different positions in the class system. Miss Julie is just as capricious, ordering John around like a slave, and then transforming into a damsel in distress. The back-and-forth continues, until lust overpowers them both and they end up in John's bedroom. Kathleen listens to their coupling through John's bedroom door before returning to her own bedroom and weeping inconsolably.

Back with Miss Julie, John reveals that he has never been in love with her. When they were children, John reveals that he had the same dirty thoughts about her as every other peasant boy on the estate. To Miss Julie's shock, John then unleashes an escalating barrage of verbal and emotional abuse. He calls her a whore and taunts her with the possibility that he may have gotten her pregnant.  As a shattered Miss Julie begins showing signs of psychosis, John orders her to break into her father's desk and steal all of  his money. He promises her that they will use the money to elope and start a hotel in Switzerland.

John goes to Kathleen and makes sexual advances to her as well; she rebuffs him angrily. She begins dressing John in his Sunday clothes, announcing that they are going to church together, where John will ask God for forgiveness.  John pretends to agree.  Kathleen expresses disgust that John has so little respect for his employers as to sleep with Miss Julie, and that Miss Julie lowered herself to sleep with him in turn.  She tells him that they will be leaving the house and seeking employment elsewhere.

Returning with the money and the cage which contains her beloved pet bird, Miss Julie watches in horror as John sadistically beheads her bird with a meat cleaver. Having a second breakdown, Miss Julie screams at John, telling him that she hates him and that there is blood between them now.

As Miss Julie picks up the stolen money from the floor, Kathleen arrives in her Sunday clothes. After listening to Miss Julie's monologue about eloping with John and the hotel in Switzerland, Kathleen gently explains to Miss Julie about the strength she draws from her own Christian Faith. Miss Julie expresses sadness that she does not share Kathleen's faith.

Before she leaves, Kathleen lovingly urges John to come to church with her, saying gently that he can benefit from a good sermon. To Kathleen's visible distress, John refuses.

As a deeply hurt Kathleen leaves, John gives Miss Julie his straight razor and urges her to commit suicide. Hesitating, Miss Julie expresses fear of going to Hell due to her high social rank. But John replies that Miss Julie is no longer one of the first, having lost her virginity, she is now one of the last.

As John walks up the castle stairs to deliver the Baron's boots and breakfast, Miss Julie walks to the brook seen in the opening moments of the film. The last image seen before the credits is of Miss Julie lying dead by the brook with the stolen money in a bag around her neck, having slit her wrist with John's straight razor.

Production
Synnøve Hørsdal of Oslo-based Maipo Film was the producer, along with co-producers Teun Hilte of London-based The Apocalypse Films Company Ltd. and Rita Dagher of Paris-based Senorita Films.

Filming began in April 2013. In a change of setting from the original Sweden of the play, the film was shot at Castle Coole, a late 18th-century country mansion in County Fermanagh, Northern Ireland. Filming lasted for five weeks. For Farrell, John was one of the hardest roles in his career due to the source material's "sustained cruelty and trauma".

Reception
Miss Julie has an approval rating of 52% on review aggregator website Rotten Tomatoes, based on 54 reviews, and an average rating of 5.6/10. The website's critical consensus states, "Miss Julie definitely gives Jessica Chastain and Colin Farrell room to shine, but neglects to leave them a solid enough setting to augment their efforts". Metacritic assigned the film a weighted average score of 56 out of 100, based on 18 critics, indicating "mixed or average reviews".

Many reviewers noted the strong performances by the three actors, but criticized Ullmann as a director for keeping the film too "static", "airless", and tied to the stage play. Film Journal International noted several issues with the directing, such as the "unnecessary and squishy soft-focus flashbacks" and the "tacky shock effect" of the bird's death. It claimed the incorporation of classical music dipped the experience in "aural 'class' that is merely more distancing for the viewer", and that the overuse of close-up shots led the source material to not "breathe and bloom of its own dramatic accord". Richard Ouzounian criticized the pacing as "just a bit too stately for words". Sheila O'Malley wrote for RogerEbert.com, "The claustrophobia of the kitchen is overwhelming in the film, and the shots of Miss Julie wandering through the manor by herself, her posture broken and stiff, her dress falling off her shoulder, give us a welcome (and yet rivetingly disturbing) change of scene." She continued, "The film has undeniable power," and assures that if one is interested in raw and intense acting at its finest, this film is incredible. A detractor of Chastain's performance was Ouzounian, who found it "too relentlessly contemporary" and having "a passion that you just know is going to end badly".

References

External links

Films based on works by August Strindberg
French films based on plays
French drama films
British films based on plays
Films directed by Liv Ullmann
2014 films
2014 drama films
Films set in country houses
Films shot in Ireland
British drama films
Norwegian drama films
English-language Norwegian films
English-language French films
English-language Irish films
Works based on Miss Julie
2010s English-language films
2010s British films
2010s French films